The Bradshaw-Duncan House, also known as Cedarcrest Farm at 8502 Todds Point Rd. near Crestwood, Kentucky, was listed on the National Register of Historic Places in 2005.

The Italianate house was built during 1855–1860, incorporating an original Federal-styled part of the house built in 1814. It was modified further in c.1970 and 2000.

References

Houses on the National Register of Historic Places in Kentucky
Italianate architecture in Kentucky
Houses completed in 1814
National Register of Historic Places in Oldham County, Kentucky
Houses in Oldham County, Kentucky
Houses completed in 1860